The Valdosta Daily Times is a daily newspaper published in Valdosta, Georgia, United States. It is the highest-circulation property operated by South Georgia Media Group, a division of Community Newspaper Holdings Inc. CNHI acquired the paper in 2000 from Thomson.

References

External links 
 The Valdosta Daily Times Website
 CNHI Website

Newspapers published in Georgia (U.S. state)
Daily Times